The Encyclopedia of British Columbia is an encyclopedia first published in 1999. It was published by Harbour Publishing, and edited by Daniel Francis. It contained some 4,000 articles and 1,000 pictures about the Canadian province of British Columbia. The hardcover edition came with a CD-ROM version of the book; ten years in the making, it has been described as "a labour of love" by The Globe and Mail. A best seller with 30,000 copies in print, now it is only available online for a fee, and is known as KnowBC. There it continues to be updated and expanded by Daniel Francis. The KnowBC portal includes access to many other Harbour Publishing publications.

References

References

External links
Publisher's Site
Official Site

Canadian encyclopedias
Works about British Columbia